Originally is an album by drummer Art Blakey and The Jazz Messengers recorded in 1956, but not released on the Columbia label until 1982. The album features unreleased tracks from the sessions that produced The Jazz Messengers and Hard Bop which have since been released as bonus tracks on those albums and Drum Suite.

Reception

AllMusic awarded the album 2 stars stating "This LP contains valuable performances by the early Jazz Messengers that sat unissued until decades later.... Although not an essential set, Art Blakey fans will find this album to be a valuable gapfiller in the history of The Jazz Messengers".

Track listing 
 "Late Show" (Hank Mobley) - 7:08   
 "Ill Wind" (Harold Arlen, Ted Koehler) - 2:52   
 "Weird-O" (Mobley) - 7:05   
 "Carol's Interlude" [Alternative Take] (Mobley) - 6:14   
 "Lil' T" (Donald Byrd) - 8:08   
 "The New Message" (Byrd) - 8:38   
 "Gershwin Medley: Rhapsody in Blue/Summertime/Someone to Watch Over Me/The Man I Love" (George Gershwin) - 4:51  
Recorded in New York City on April 5 (tracks 1 & 2), May 4 (tracks 3 & 4), June 25 (tracks 5 & 6), and December 12 (track 7), 1956

Personnel 
Art Blakey - drums
Donald Byrd (tracks 1-6), Bill Hardman (track 7) - trumpet
Hank Mobley (tracks 1-4), Ira Sullivan (tracks 5 & 6) - tenor saxophone 
Jackie McLean - alto saxophone (track 7)
Horace Silver (tracks 1-4), Kenny Drew (tracks 5 & 6), Sam Dockery (track 7) - piano
Doug Watkins (tracks 1-4), Wilbur Ware (tracks 5 & 6), Spanky DeBrest (track 7) - bass

References 

Art Blakey albums
The Jazz Messengers albums
1982 albums
Columbia Records albums